Balgonie is a town in southeast Saskatchewan. Situated at the intersection of Highways 10, 46, and the Trans-Canada Highway, the town is part of the White Butte region and neighbours Pilot Butte, White City, and McLean. As well, it is located 25 kilometres east of the province's capital city, Regina. As of the 2016 census, Balgonie had a population of 1,765, an 8.3% growth from 2011. The town is governed by the Balgonie Town Council and is surrounded by the Rural Municipality of Edenwold No. 158. Balgonie is located in Treaty 4 territory.

Balgonie has a Subway restaurant, two gas stations, an outdoor pool, and an ice arena. It is also home to Greenall School.

History
Balgonie was named for Balgonie Castle in Scotland. In 1882, the first train ran through the area on the Canadian Pacific Railway, and a post office was established in 1883. In 1884, Sir John Lister Kaye established a model farm near the railway in Balgonie, with the town being the easternmost point of the old 76 Ranch lands.

A school was built in 1891, and Balgonie was incorporated as a village in 1903 and as a town in 1907.

One of Balgonie's most famous residents was William Wallace Gibson (1876–1965), who created the first Canadian-built airplane. Gibson successfully flew his airplane in Victoria in 1910. Gibson was the subject of the 1991 stop-motion animated short The Balgonie Birdman, directed by Brian Duchscherer and produced by the National Film Board of Canada.

The town's population plummeted during the 1930s and 1940s, but the completion of the Trans-Canada Highway in the late 1950s brought new growth.

Demographics 

See also
List of communities in Saskatchewan
List of towns in Saskatchewan

References

External links

Edenwold No. 158, Saskatchewan
Towns in Saskatchewan
Division No. 6, Saskatchewan